Pablo Trigueros Estrada (born 4 March 1993) is a Spanish footballer who plays as a central defender for Cultural y Deportiva Leonesa.

Club career
Born in Herreruela de Oropesa, Toledo, Castile-La Mancha, Trigueros was an Atlético Madrid youth graduate. During his first three seasons, he alternated between the C and B-teams in Tercera División and Segunda División B, respectively.

In August 2015, Trigueros joined Arandina CF in the third division. In July 2017, after suffering relegation, he moved to fellow league team Rápido de Bouzas.

On 11 June 2018, Trigueros signed for SD Ponferradina, still in division three. He was a regular starter in the campaign, contributing with one goal in 29 appearances as his side returned to Segunda División after three years.

Trigueros made his professional debut on 18 August 2019, starting and scoring the opener in a 1–3 away loss against Cádiz CF. He left the club after his contract expired in July 2020, and signed a one-year deal with fellow second division side CD Mirandés on 1 October.

On 6 July 2021, after featuring sparingly, Trigueros signed for Deportivo de La Coruña in Primera División RFEF.

Personal life
Trigueros' cousin and uncle, both named Manuel, were midfielders. The elder played no higher than the second tier for Granada CF, while the younger had a lengthy La Liga career with Villarreal CF.

References

External links

1993 births
Living people
Sportspeople from the Province of Toledo
Spanish footballers
Footballers from Castilla–La Mancha
Association football defenders
Segunda División players
Segunda División B players
Tercera División players
Atlético Madrid C players
Atlético Madrid B players
Arandina CF players
SD Ponferradina players
CD Mirandés footballers
Deportivo de La Coruña players